The Sudan Football Association (S.F.A.) is the governing body of football in Sudan. It was established in 1936 and affiliated with FIFA in 1948.
Along with the national associations of Egypt, Ethiopia and South Africa, the Sudan Football Association was one of the founding members of the Confederation of African Football (CAF) in 1957. The International Federation of Football Associations, FIFA, decided to suspend the activities of the Sudan Football Association (SFA) starting from Friday 30 June 2017. The suspension was lifted on Thursday 13 July 2017.

Logos

Presidential history
Abdel Halim Muhammad
Mohammed Talat Fareed
Mamoun Mubark Aman
Omer Al Bakri Abu Haraz
Kamal Shaddad
Mutasim Jaafar Sarkhatm

National Teams
Men
Sudan national football team
Sudan national under-23 football team
Sudan national under-20 football team
Sudan national under-17 football team

Women
Sudan women's national football team

Competitions
Men
Sudan Premier League
Sudan Cup

Women
Sudanese Women League

References

External links 
 Official website 
 Sudan at FIFA.com
 Sudan at CAF Online

Sudan
Football in Sudan
Football
Sports organizations established in 1936